This is a list of tunnels built in the city of Seattle, Washington, USA.

The Puget Sound region, where Seattle lies, has a history of glaciation that has left many hills and ridges that civil engineers have needed to traverse for transportation and utilities.  Some of these tunnels are part of megaprojects.

Tunnels

See also
List of tunnels in the United States

Further reading

References

Seattle
Tunnels
Tunnels
Tunnels